The Australian Defence Organisation (ADO) is composed of the armed forces of the Commonwealth of Australia, the Australian Defence Force (ADF), and the Australian Public Service government department, the Department of Defence which is composed of a range of civilian support organisations.

The Chief of the Defence Force (CDF) leads the Australian Defence Force and the Secretary of Defence leads the Department of Defence though both jointly manage the Australian Defence Organisation under a diarchy, and both report directly to the Minister for Defence.

The highest active rank in the Australian Defence Force is reserved for the Chief of the Defence Force. This is a four-star rank and the CDF is the only Australian military officer at that level. As a result of the diarchy, the Secretary of the Department of Defence is of the equivalent civilian four-star level in the Senior Executive Service of the Australian Public Service.

Command and Control 
The Commander-in-Chief of the Australian Defence Force is set out under Section 68 of the Constitution of Australia, stating "the command in chief of the naval and military forces of the Commonwealth is vested in the Governor-General as the Queen's representative".

In practice, the Governor-General is the ceremonial head of the Australian Defence Force and command and control power is delegated to the Prime Minister and the Minister for Defence. The National Security Committee of Cabinet also plays an important role in the strategic direction of the Australian Defence Organisation including directing overseas deployments and going to war.

Five-star level 
Currently the five-star level is not an active serving rank in the Australian Defence Force. Australia has only had one active serving five-star rank officer within the armed forces of the Commonwealth of Australia. This was Sir Thomas Blamey who was appointed Field Marshal in the Australian Army in 1950 and presented his field marshal's baton by the then Governor-General William McKell. Blamey was seriously ill at the time and died three months later.

Until his death, His Royal Highness Prince Philip, Duke of Edinburgh held the ranks of Field Marshal, Admiral of the Fleet, and Marshal of the Royal Australian Air Force. He was appointed to each rank on 2 April 1954.

His Majesty George VI was also appointed Marshal of the Royal Australian Air Force, maintaining the rank from 2 June 1939 until his death on 6 February 1952.

Four-star level 
In the Australian Defence Force, guided by the Defence Force Regulations 1952, the level of four-star rank is that of commissioned officer O-10 in the Australian Defence Force ranks code. This means the Australian Army rank of general, the Royal Australian Navy rank of admiral, and the Royal Australian Air Force rank of air chief marshal.

In the Australian Public Service, guided by the Public Service Act 1999, the level of four-star rank is the equivalent civilian level of Senior Executive Service Band 4, which is styled as secretary with the leadership of a department.

 Chief of the Defence Force (CDF)
 Secretary of Defence (SECDEF)
Director-General of the Australian Signals Directorate (ASD)

Three-star level 
In the Australian Defence Force, guided by the Defence Force Regulations 1952, the level of three-star rank is that of commissioned officer O-9 in the Australian Defence Force ranks code. This means the Australian Army rank of lieutenant general, the Royal Australian Navy rank of vice admiral, and the Royal Australian Air Force rank of air marshal.

In the Australian Public Service, guided by the Public Service Act 1999, the level of three-star rank is the equivalent civilian level of Senior Executive Service Band 3, which is styled as associate secretary or deputy secretary (DEPSEC) or a chief portfolio officer, with the leadership of a group or agency.

Australian Defence Force 
 Vice Chief of the Defence Force (VCDF)
 Chief of Navy (CN)
 Chief of Army (CA)
 Chief of Air Force (CAF)
 Chief of Joint Operations (CJOPS)
 Chief of Joint Capabilities (CJC)
 Chief of Defence Intelligence (CDI)
 Principal Deputy Director-General of the Australian Signals Directorate

Department of Defence 
 Associate Secretary of the Department of Defence
 Deputy Secretary for Strategic Policy and Intelligence 
 Deputy Secretary for Capability Acquisition and Sustainment 
 Deputy Secretary for People 
  Deputy Secretary for Estate and Infrastructure 
 Chief Finance Officer 
 Chief Information Officer 
 Chief Defence Scientist

Two-star level 
In the Australian Defence Force, guided by the Defence Force Regulations 1952, the level of two-star rank is that of commissioned officer O-8 in the Australian Defence Force ranks code. This means the Australian Army rank of major general, the Royal Australian Navy rank of rear admiral, and the Royal Australian Air Force rank of air vice marshal.

In the Australian Public Service, guided by the Public Service Act 1999, the level of two-star rank is the equivalent civilian level of Senior Executive Service Band 2, which is styled as First Assistant Secretary (FAS), General Manager, Chief or Head with the leadership of a division or agency.

Vice Chief of the Defence Force Group 
 Head of Force Design
 Head of Centenary of ANZAC
 Head of Joint Capability Management and Integration
 Head of Military Strategic Commitments
 Head of Reserve and Youth and Commander of the Australian Defence Force Cadets 
 Executive Director of the Australian Civil-Military Centre

Joint Capabilities Group 
 Commander of Joint Capabilities  (CJC)
 Commander of the Australian Defence College
 Commander of the Joint Logistics Command 
 Commander Joint Health and Surgeon General
 Head of Information Warfare

Capability Acquisition and Sustainment Group 
 Head of Joint Systems 
 Head of Maritime Systems 
 General manager for Submarines
 Head of Future Submarine Program
 General manager for Ships
 Head of Land Systems
 Head of Helicopter Systems
 Head of Aerospace Systems
 Head of Joint Strike Fighter Program
 General Counsel and First Assistant Secretary for Commercial
 First Assistant Secretary for Program Performance
 Group Business Manager
 Chief Finance Officer

Strategic Policy and Intelligence Group 
 Head of the Australian Defence Staff, Washington DC
 Director of the Defence Intelligence Organisation (DIO)
 Director of the Australian Geospatial-Intelligence Organisation (AGO)
 First Assistant Secretary for International Policy 
 First Assistant Secretary for Strategic Policy 
 First Assistant Secretary for Defence Industry Policy
 First Assistant Secretary for Contestability
 First Assistant Secretary for the Naval Shipbuilding Taskforce

Australian Army 
 Deputy Chief of Army (DCA)
 Commander of the Forces Command (CFC)
 Head of Land Capability
 Special Operations Commander Australia
 Commander of the 1st Division (Deployable Joint Forces Headquarters)
 Commander of the 2nd Division

Joint Operations Command 
 Commander of the Maritime Border Command
 Deputy Chief of Joint Operations (DCJOPS)
 Commander of Joint Task Force 633 (Middle East Region)

Royal Australian Navy 
 Deputy Chief of Navy (DCN) and Head of Navy People Training and Resources
 Commander Australian Fleet (COMAUSFLT)
 Head of Navy Capability
 Head of Navy Engineering

Royal Australian Air Force 
 Deputy Chief of Air Force (DCAF)
 Air Commander Australia (ACAUST)

Defence Science and Technology Group 
 Chief of Science Strategy and Program 
 Chief of Science Partnerships and Engagement
 Chief of Research Services
 Chief of Maritime
 Chief of Land
 Chief of Aerospace
 Chief of Joint and Operations Analysis
 Chief of National Security and Intelligence, Surveillance and Reconnaissance
 Chief of Cyber and Electronic Warfare
 Chief of Weapons and Combat Systems

Chief Information Officer Group 
 Chief Technology Officer
 Head of ICT Operations
 First Assistant Secretary for ICT Delivery

Defence People Group 
 First Assistant Secretary for People Capability
 First Assistant Secretary for People Policy and Culture
 First Assistant Secretary for People Services

Defence Security and Estate Group 
 First Assistant Secretary for Service Delivery
 First Assistant Secretary for Infrastructure

Chief Finance Officer Group 
 First Assistant Secretary for Financial Services
 First Assistant Secretary for Resource and Assurance

Associate Secretary Group 
 First Assistant Secretary for Ministerial and Executive Coordination and Communication
 First Assistant Secretary for Governance and Reform
 First Assistant Secretary for Audit and Fraud Control
 First Assistant Secretary for Security and Vetting Service
 Inspector General
 Judge Advocate General (JAG)
 Chief Judge Advocate
 Head of Defence Legal

See also

 Senior Australian Defence Organisation Positions

References

External links
Defence leaders: high-profile senior personnel

 Australian Defence Organisation website

Leadership of the Australian Defence Force
Australian Defence Force